The Nokia E52 and Nokia E55 are smartphones from Nokia's business-oriented Eseries range. They run Symbian OS v9.3 (S60 3rd Edition FP1). The E55 was announced on 16 February 2009, whilst the E52 was announced later on 6 May 2009. They are both physically and functionally identical, except that the E55 has a 'half-QWERTY' keyboard, similar to the SureType keyboard on BlackBerry Pearl, whereas the E52 revision has a traditional T9 keypad.

They are available in Black, Black Aluminum, Metal Grey aluminium, White Aluminium and Gold. They came with a 1GB MicroSD memory card, but it supports MicroSD cards with up to 32GB memory. It also has 60 MB free user memory. The E52 is the successor to Nokia's successful E51 model. Latest firmware version is v091.004 released on June 2, 2012.

The E52 and E55 were, at 9.9 mm thickness, very slim for its time, and feature mostly metallic bodies. Nokia called the E55 the world's thinnest smartphone (it was just 0.1 mm thinner than Nokia E71). The E55 model has a unique 'compact' QWERTY keyboard featuring two letters in the QWERTY order on a single key.

Features

Accelerometer Sensors (Automatic Landscape/Portrait View, snooze for alarm, make incoming ring silent)
 Light sensor (for automatically set brightness for display and keypads)
 Microphone with the noise reduction function (used during phone calls and for video recording)
One-Touch Keys
USB Charging
3.5mm Standard Audio Connector
TCP/IP support
Serves as a Data Modem
 GPS and A-GPS navigation via pre-installed OVI Maps or any other 3rd party applications
Bluetooth 2.0 EDR, A2DP
3.5G Support
WAP 2.0/XHTML, HTML Browser (Flash Lite 3.0 Support)
Digital Home Support
Push To Talk (PTT)
SMS, MMS, Email Support
Stereo FM Radio with RDS and Internet Radio
Printing to File (Remote), using LPR or USB PictBridge-compatible printer
MTP (Mobile Transfer Protocol) support
Java with MIDP 2.1 and CLDC 1.1, JavaScript 1.3 and 1.5 browser support
Voice Recorder
Voice Command Capability
Smart Dialing
Text Message and Email - Audio Reader
8 Hours Talk Time
23 Hours Music Playback (battery dependent)
23 Days of Stand-by Time
PDF Reader
Remote Lock/Wipe Over-The-Air 
Quick Office Viewer/Editor - Word, Excel, PowerPoint Support (Free Update for Office 2007 formats support)
Power Saver Mode

Battery life

It has been observed that the 5.5 Watt-Hour, 1500 mAh, 3.7 V battery can easily last 27 days of practical use. This is considerably higher than other phones in its class made by Nokia and other manufacturers. If WiFi, Bluetooth are used and built-in VOIP client is active, the battery will last about 24 hours.

References

External links 
 

Mobile phones introduced in 2009
Nokia ESeries
Mobile phones with user-replaceable battery

de:Nokia Eseries#Nokia E52